Bhama Vijayam is a 1967 Indian Telugu-language swashbuckler film, produced by Somasekhar and Radha Krishna, and directed by C.Pulliah. It stars N. T. Rama Rao and Devika, with music composed by T. V. Raju. The film is based on Gollabhama (1947) which itself is based on the stories of Kaasi Majililu written in Telugu by Madhira Subbanna Deekshitulu.

Plot 
Sundari (Devika) a tribal beauty captured by Kalinga Bhupati Kamavardhanudu (Rajanala) when he tries to molest her, she kills him and escapes. The soldiers follow her and she was saved by a Prince, Jayachandra (N. T. Rama Rao). Jayachandra loves her at first sight, but he learns that she hates Kings. So, he acts as an ordinary soldier, takes her to the fort where he reforms her as a wise woman and marries her with the permission of his parents (Mukkamala & S. Varalakshmi). Meanwhile, Vahini (Vijaya Nirmala), a heavenly dancer arrives at earth who sees Jayachandra, falls for him and takes away. At earth, the King, Queen and Sundari are worried about the Prince's disappearance. In heaven, Jayachandra did not yield to the love of Vahini. After some time, he requests her to meet his wife for a night. So, she brings Sundari to heaven where both of them unknowingly drink the divine drink nectar Amurtham and sleep, when she awakes, she is back in the palace. Nobody believes her acquaintance with Jayachandra when she becomes pregnant and the King gives her the death sentence. Due to the nectar, she became immortal, as a result, soldiers could not kill and leave her in the forest where tribal people gives her shelter. After that, she gives birth to a baby boy and gives him away to King Udayarka (Dhulipala). Mohini (L. Vijayalakshmi) sister of Vahini also attracted towards Jayachandra. She sprays a medicine on him, by which Jayachandra forgets his past. After facing so many troubles, Sundari lands at a brothel house. Twenty years roll by, due to immortality, Sundari did not lose her beauty, but she protects her chastity and her child Balarka (Nagaraju) also grows up. Once he rescues Sundari and she recognizes him as his son. Balarka inquires about her and goes to meet her where he listens to the conversation of a cow & calf that a person in lust cannot recognize the relationships. Now Sundari could not face her son and jumps into the fire, but she was protected by a cowherd couple. In heaven, Jayachandra gets rid of Vahini & Mohini and returns. After reaching the earth, Jayachandra reveals the entire facts to his parents when they reply, Sundari has been sentenced but he remembers that she is immortal. At present, he is in search of her. Parallelly, Balarka finds out Sundari as his mother, so, he too goes moves. Finally, all of them meet in the forest and the movie ends on a happy note with the reunion of the family.

Cast 
N. T. Rama Rao as Jaya Chandra
Devika as Sundari
V. Nagayya as Saint
Relangi as Gunapathi
Rajanala as Kalinga Bhupati Kamavardhanudu
Dhulipala as Udayarka Maharaju
Mukkamala as King
Chadalavada
Raja Babu
Nagaraju
Jagga Rao
Vijaya Nirmala as Vauhini
L. Vijayalakshmi as Mohini
S. Varalakshmi as Queen
Girija as Sarasa
Rushyendramani

Soundtrack 
Music composed by T. V. Raju.

References

External links 

1960s Telugu-language films
Films directed by C. Pullayya
Films scored by T. V. Raju
Indian fantasy adventure films
Indian swashbuckler films